Club Sportiv LPS HD Clinceni, commonly known as Clinceni and formerly known as Academica Clinceni is a Romanian amateur football club based in Clinceni, Ilfov County, currently playing in the Liga IV - Ilfov County. In the summer of 2022 former Academica Clinceni went bankrupt, but the club was refounded as LPS HD (Liceul cu Program Sportiv Helmuth Duckadam) Clinceni.

Academica Clinceni was founded in Buftea in 2005, following a merger between two clubs, and enrolled directly in the third division. It promoted to the Liga II at the end of the 2007–08 season, but participated in the competition for only one year after it sold its place and returned to the third tier. After several years Buftea promoted again, but following the withdrawn of their financial support the club had to relocate three times—The first time in 2013, when it was bought by the authorities from Clinceni, also in Ilfov County, one year later when it moved to Pitești, and finally when it returned to Clinceni and settled on the current name in 2015.

In 2017, Academica started a partnership with FCSB, loaning a number of youth players from the latter's academy, and achieved a surprising promotion to the Liga I in 2019. The team represents the smallest locality to ever participate in the Romanian first league, the commune of Clinceni only having a population of roughly 5,000 people.

History

CS Buftea, first years and the ascension (2005–2013)
FC Academica Clinceni was founded in 2005 under the name of CS Buftea, being originally based in the town of Buftea, Ilfov County. CS Buftea was formed following a merger between a local team from Buftea, which was playing in the fourth division and Cimentul Fieni, first colors of the club were red, white and blue and as a peculiarity, the senior squad of the club was enrolled directly in the third tier (Liga III) and assigned to the third series, on the place occupied by Cimentul, where it was ranked 6th at the end of the season. Next season (2006–07) was a better one for the club located only 20 km north-west of Bucharest, finishing on the podium and achieving the bronze medal, but pretty far from the champions Concordia Chiajna (13 points) and runners-up Juventus București (8 points). The ascension of the club continued and at the end of the 2007–08 season has advanced a place, finishing this time as runners-up, in a third series totally dominated by FC Ploiești which had an advance of 19 points in front of "the red-white-blue team". After a promotion play-off tournament held on neutral ground, at Câmpina on Poiana Stadium, CS Buftea promoted for the first time in its history in the Liga II. The promotion was obtained after winning the first group of the play-off tournament, a group consisting of Juventus București, Aerostar Bacău and "the red-white-blue team".

In the summer of 2008, after the promotion, the football club led at that time by president Sorin Dumitrescu and general manager Dumitru Tudor, realized that it would be quite difficult to manage by itself in the second tier and started a collaboration with the top-flight squad Politehnica Timișoara. Through this collaboration at Buftea arrived, on loan, a number of important players such as Cristian Zimmermann, Ioan Mera, Alin Rațiu, Marian Chițu, Adrian Popa, Cristian Scutaru, Artur Pătraș, Alexandru Popovici, Florin Sandu, Adrian Poparadu, Gueye Mansour or Mircea Axente, among others. With this dream team in which more than half of the players were on loan from Politehnica Timișoara, the club was quickly perceived as a satellite of "the white and violet" club. The technical bench has been completed with Ion Balaur (head coach), Daniel Iftodi and Vasile Caciureac (assistant managers), Nicolae Ciocănișteanu (goalkeeping coach) and the club near Bucharest ended the autumn season on an honorable seven place, with 23 points, over teams such as Petrolul Ploiești, Sportul Studențesc, Concordia Chiajna, FC Botoșani or FCM Bacău. During the winter break the collaboration with Politehnica Timișoara was broken, the club from the banks of Bega choosing Gloria Buzău as the new informal satellite, president Sorin Dumitrescu left the club, in his place being named Constantin Niță, all the important players were redirected to Buzău and the technical staff resigned. In January 2009 executive president was named Anamaria Prodan, a football agent, and Cristian Țermure was hired as the new head coach, the results were far below expectations, the squad accumulating only 10 points and avoiding the relegation mostly due to the points made in the first part of the season.

The tough spring of 2009 was clear evidence for the town of Buftea that the club could not sustain itself financially at this level and in July 2009 mayor of Buftea announced that the team sold its place in the Liga II to Săgeata Stejaru for 500,000€ and that the club will continue to play in the Liga III, in Săgeata's place, the two clubs practically swapping their places. After "the self-relegation" episode, the club started the Liga III season with a small name change, now being known under the name of ACS Buftea (Asocția Club Sportiv Buftea), but with the same logo and colors. A 5th place at the end of the season, followed by a 9th place at the end of the 2010–11 campaign put the club in the shadow, now being only a mid-table team in the third tier of the Romanian football league system.

In the summer of 2011, Buftenii has gathered the ranks and under the leadership of president Sorin Dumitrescu (also the former president of the club during the 2007–08 campaign) and head coach Lavi Hrib obtained a promotion against the odds, a promotion that was disputed until the last rounds of the season, the main rival, Viitorul Domnești, finishing at the same number of points, 51. After the promotion, the same financial problems, as at the previous one, appeared, this time much more serious. In summer 2012, the town of Buftea decided that it could not sustain financially the club in the second division and ordered the football club to withdraw before starting the season. Meanwhile, a group of businessmen from Snagov showed interest in taking over the club, but the negotiations were in progress when the squad should have play a Romanian Cup preliminary round against third division side ACS Berceni. So, in order not to be excluded, the team sent on the pitch a first eleven composed mostly of youth players, registering not only the biggest defeat in the history of the club, but probably the biggest defeat in the history of the Romania football, 0–31. Finally bought by a group of private sponsors, ACS Buftea was enrolled in the championship, Lavi Hrib, the head coach which promoted the club in the Liga II, was sacked after a few rounds being replaced by Giani Kiriță, who was then replaced during the winter break by Valentin Bădoi. Surprisingly the squad had good results being ranked 6th at the end of the season, the best result ever for the club near Bucharest.

Academica, a club on the roads (2013–2017)
On 2 August 2013 the club was sold, by its private owners, to commune of Clinceni, a locality that had at that time a team in the Liga III, named Inter Clinceni. The procedures moved quickly, ACS Buftea changed its name to FC Clinceni, the red, white and blue colors were changed in black and blue, Inter Clinceni was kept in the third tier, but its best players, together with a group from ACS Buftea made the new squad, Valentin Bădoi being named as the head coach. The club was ranked 6th at the end of the 2012–13 edition, equaling their best performance, achieved only one season before.

In the summer of 2014, it seemed that the good results of the club do not provide also the financial security, the commune of Clinceni choosing to sell the club, at only one year after buying it. The new buyer was Constantin Moroianu, a businessman and owner of Cafea Fortuna, the largest Romanian coffee maker. Moroianu chose to move and rebrand the club, this time the base was set outside the Ilfov County, more exactly in Pitești, Argeș County, 115 km from Clinceni; the club was renamed as Academica Argeș, the black and blue kits were replaced by the new white and purple ones and as manager was hired Marius Baciu. Academica Argeș started as a project which was supposed to replace FC Argeș Pitești, the traditional club of the city and double champion of Romania, football club which was declared bankrupt in the same year. The new project, however, did not attract the supporters' sympathy or the financial support of the local authorities and after a 2014–15 season in which "the Academics" fought for promotion until the end, finally losing it in front of FC Voluntari, Moroianu withdrew and sold the club back to commune of Clinceni.

Back to Clinceni in the summer of 2015, Academica Argeș was renamed as Academica Clinceni, the colors were changed back from white and purple to black and blue and the logo also suffered some transformations. Former footballers Bogdan Apostu and László Balint were named as general manager, respectively head coach. In the winter of 2016 financial problems were back to "the Academics" and after a difficult period, during the winter break, the club was sold again. At a short time after the transaction, in the Romanian press started to appear many articles about the fact that the club was bought by a Chinese company. At the end of the season "the black and blues" finished on a well deserved six place, away from any worries.

"The Academics" are going up (2017–2022)

In the summer of 2017, local authorities from Clinceni have returned to the club's ownership, former footballer Sorin Paraschiv was named as general manager and Erik Lincar as head coach. "The Academics" also returned to the old methods and started a collaboration with a top-flight club, this time FCSB, club which loaned some young players in the Ilfov County. During the winter break Lincar left the club, being replaced by Ilie Poenaru and "the black and blues" finished the championship on the 6th place. 2018–19 season was a fantastic one for the club, which under the led of Ilie Poenaru and with a squad composed of young players coming on loan from FCSB, others who grew up at Sportul Studențesc Academy and some of them with first league appearances such as Vasile Olariu, Paul Pîrvulescu or captain Răzvan Patriche, managed to promote in the Liga I, for the first time in its history, surpassing teams such as Universitatea Cluj, Petrolul Ploiești, Argeș Pitești or UTA Arad. ACS Buftea was previously in collaboration with Politehnica Timișoara.

LPS HD Clinceni (2022-present)
After being directly relegated to Liga III due to financial problems, Academicienii made the decision to take it from the bottom, more precisely from Liga IV.
Starting with the 2022–2023 season, Ilfovenii will participate in Seria 2 of the Liga IV - Ilfov County, using the name of former Steaua's goalkeeper, Helmut Duckadam.

Youth program
Youth academy of FC Academica Clinceni is still a project in development, currently in the academy of the club that represents the smallest locality that ever had a football team in the first tier, are no less than 700 kids and youth players.

Grounds

Stadionul Clinceni
Clinceni Stadium, located in Clinceni, Ilfov County is the current home ground of Academica Clinceni. Opened in 2011 and with a capacity of 4,500 seats, the stadium, also known as Clinceni Arena, is the main ground of a modern complex that consists of many other football pitches. The stadium was between 2011 and 2015 the home ground of Inter Clinceni and during the 2013–14 season, then again from 2015, the home ground of Academica. In the autumn of 2018 started a renovation process that included, among others, the pitch modernization, capacity expansion to 4,500 seats and the installment of a floodlight system. The second ground of the Clinceni Complex is approved to host Liga II matches, having a capacity of 1,000 seats.

Honours
Liga II
Runners-up (2): 2014–15, 2018–19
Liga III
Winners (1): 2011–12
Runners-up (1): 2007–08

Players

First-team squad

Club officials

Board of directors

 Last updated: 28 February 2022
 Source:Board of directors

Current technical staff

 Last updated: 28 February 2022
 Source:Technical staff

League history

Notable former players
The footballers enlisted below have had international cap(s) for their respective countries at junior and/or senior level and/or more than 50 caps for FC Academica Clinceni/LPS HD Clinceni. 

  Andrei Antohi
  Mircea Axente
  Mihai Butean
  Costin Gheorghe
  Arman Karamyan
  Artavazd Karamyan
  Giani Kiriță
  Cezar Lungu
  Artur Pătraș
  Bogdan Pătrașcu
  Adrian Popa
  Cornel Predescu
  Ion Prodan
  Cristian Pulhac
  Cristian Scutaru
  Stelian Stancu
  Florin Ștefan
  Andrei Vițelaru

Notable former managers

  Ionel Augustin
  Marius Baciu
  László Balint
  Valentin Bădoi
  Lavi Hrib
  Giani Kiriță
  Erik Lincar
  Marin Radu
  Ilie Poenaru

References

 
Football clubs in Romania
Football clubs in Ilfov County
Sport in Ilfov County
Association football clubs established in 2005
Liga I clubs
Liga II clubs
Liga III clubs
Liga IV clubs
2005 establishments in Romania